The 11th Massachusetts Infantry Regiment was an infantry regiment in the Union Army during the American Civil War. Organized in Boston in May 1861, the 11th Massachusetts Infantry was made up mostly of men from Boston, but also from Charlestown and Dorchester. The leading force behind the formation of the regiment was its first colonel, George Clark Jr., who had been an officer in the Massachusetts state militia. The regiment was known as the "Boston Volunteers."

Arriving in Washington, D.C. in June, the 11th Massachusetts Infantry was one of only three Massachusetts regiments to participate in the First Battle of Bull Run. The regiment spent the early fall of 1861 helping to build fortifications around Washington. In October, the 11th was stationed at Bud's Ferry in Indian Head, Maryland where they remained on picket duty for the winter of 1861-1862. The 11th Massachusetts Infantry saw its first combat during the Peninsular Campaign in the spring of 1862. They were heavily engaged during the Second Battle of Bull Run, participated in the Battle of Fredericksburg, and suffered severe casualties at the Battle of Chancellorsville and the Battle of Gettysburg.

See also 

 Massachusetts in the Civil War
 List of Massachusetts Civil War units

Notes

References

 
 
 

Units and formations of the Union Army from Massachusetts
1861 establishments in Massachusetts
Military units and formations established in 1861
Military units and formations disestablished in 1865